Fernanda Ryff Moreira de Oliveira Horn (born 19 December 1980 in Porto Alegre) is a Brazilian sailor. She won a bronze medal in 470 class at the 2008 Summer Olympics. She has competed in 6 Olympic games which has only been matched by two other female sailors.

References

External links 
 
 
 
 

1980 births
Living people
Brazilian female sailors (sport)
Olympic sailors of Brazil
Olympic bronze medalists for Brazil
Olympic medalists in sailing
Sailors at the 2000 Summer Olympics – 470
Sailors at the 2004 Summer Olympics – 470
Sailors at the 2008 Summer Olympics – 470
Sailors at the 2012 Summer Olympics – 470
Sailors at the 2016 Summer Olympics – 470
Sailors at the 2020 Summer Olympics – 470
Medalists at the 2008 Summer Olympics
Sportspeople from Porto Alegre